The 2016–17 Jacksonville Dolphins women's basketball team represented Jacksonville University in the 2016–17 NCAA Division I women's basketball season. The Dolphins, led by fourth year head coach Yolett McPhee-McCuin, played their home games at Swisher Gymnasium and were members of the Atlantic Sun Conference. They finish the season 23–9, 11–3 in A-Sun play finish in third place. They advanced to the semifinals of the 2017 Atlantic Sun women's basketball tournament where they lost to Florida Gulf Coast. They were invited to the WNIT where they lost to Georgia Tech in the first round.

Media
All home games and conference road games were shown on ESPN3 or A-Sun.TV.

Roster

Schedule

|-
!colspan=9 style="background:#004D40; color:#FFFFFF;"| Non-conference regular season

|-
!colspan=9 style="background:#004D40; color:#FFFFFF;"| Atlantic Sun regular season

|-
!colspan=9 style="background:#004D40; color:#FFFFFF;"| Atlantic Sun Women's Tournament

|-
!colspan=9 style="background:#004D40; color:#FFFFFF;"| WNIT

Rankings

See also
 2016–17 Jacksonville Dolphins men's basketball team

References

Jacksonville
Jacksonville Dolphins women's basketball seasons
2017 Women's National Invitation Tournament participants